Tayong Dalawa (International title: The Two of Us) is a Philippine primetime drama series broadcast on ABS-CBN and worldwide on TFC from January 19, 2009 to September 25, 2009,  replacing Dyosa and was replaced by Lovers in Paris. The story revolves around two brothers (Jake Cuenca and Gerald Anderson) who share the same name, the same aspirations, and the same lady-of-interest (Kim Chiu). The title of the series was taken from one of Rey Valera’s classic songs, in a manner similar to most Filipino soap operas.

Plot summary
David "JR" Garcia Jr. was born into a poor family. His father, David Sr., deserted his mother Marlene Dionisio before he was born because his wife, Ingrid Martinez is pregnant with David "Dave" Garcia Jr.

When Audrey King and her family go to Tagaytay for a visit, she falls from a set of high stairs. JR saves her life and introduces himself as David Garcia Jr. after she asks for his name without seeing what he looked like. When Audrey is admitted to the emergency room and is asked by the witnesses and her family who saved her, she remembers the name David Garcia Jr. - however, Dave is given the credit instead of JR.

As Audrey grows up falling in love with Dave, Dave meets JR and they become the best of friends, but their families do not approve of their friendship. Dave's family thinks JR wants to use Dave for money. The siblings' mothers would not let the two hang out, although Dave's father allowed the friendship to continue. Dave's grandmother, Elizabeth, and JR's mother, Marlene, suspects David Sr. is keeping the two boys' friendship alive.

Audrey's father, Stanley Sr., sends her to Cebu to continue her studies. JR and Audrey have a chance encounter in the airport. Dave and JR enter the Philippine Military Academy where they graduate at the top of their class. The family rivalry becomes worse as everyone finds out that Dave and JR are half-siblings when David Sr. appears on graduation day. Elizabeth exerts all efforts to cover up the truth to the point that she engineers Marlene's imprisonment. Things become even worse as David Sr. dies from a gunshot wound by gun smuggling boss Leo Cardenas during a robbery on his armory on the suggestion of Ramon Lecumberri, JR's estranged older half-brother. It would be followed by more events such as the death of Audrey's mother Loretta after giving birth to her last child Robert, Ramon killing Leo to save Lola Gets and taking over the syndicate, and the involvement of Audrey's younger brother Stan in Ramon's syndicate. Further DNA testing confirms that Dave and JR are Marlene's twins and that Ingrid's stillborn son was swapped by Elizabeth with Dave (originally named David John by Marlene).

As things develop, Stanley kills Elizabeth over a financial dispute and frames JR, who is imprisoned and escapes with a former enemy, Ka Doroy, as part of a double agent operation with the military in order to infiltrate the syndicate. He discovers that the syndicate's boss, "Hunyango", is actually Marlon Cardenas, Dave's godfather and Leo's father.

After JR is hit in a later incident, Dave agrees to a kidney transplant to save his twin in exchange for a civil wedding to Audrey, but the marriage turns out to be fake because of Elizabeth’s machinations. Dave and Audrey plan a church wedding, but Dave backs out. Audrey ends up marrying JR in church and later bears him a son named Adrian. However, she dies of heart disease a few days after giving birth.

The brothers eventually face off in a final showdown with Ramon, who agrees to surrender after Marlene's appeals and completing a plan to bring down his syndicate. However, a mentally-insane Ingrid shoots Ramon in the head while being taken into custody. He survives the shooting but doctors said the bullets rendered him blind. Dave later commits Ingrid to a psychiatric hospital. Ramon is sentenced to life imprisonment and makes amends with Marlene, JR, and Dave behind bars. The three, who visit Ramon from time to time, now live together with Angela, Lily, Ula the nanny, Robert, and Adrian. The story ends with a cliffhanger: a woman and her son appears at the Garcia house one evening. They introduce themselves as Emma Garcia (a third wife of David Garcia Sr.) and David Anthony Garcia III.

Cast and characters

Main cast 
 Jake Cuenca as Lt. David "Dave" M. Garcia / David John D. Garcia
 Gerald Anderson as Lt. David "JR" D. Garcia
 Kim Chiu as Audrey D. King-Garcia

Supporting cast 
 Gina Pareño as Rita "Lola Gets" Dionisio
 Cherry Pie Picache as Marlene Dionisio 
 Agot Isidro as Ingrid Martinez-Garcia / Ingrid Martinez-Cardenas
 Mylene Dizon as Loreta Dominguez-King
 Jodi Sta. Maria as Angela Dominguez
 Alessandra de Rossi as Greta Romano
 Baron Geisler as Leo Cardenas
 Coco Martin as Ramon D. Lecumberri
 Jiro Manio as Stanley "Stan" D. King III
 Spanky Manikan as Stanley King, Sr.
 Miguel Faustmann as Col. David Garcia, Sr.
 Anita Linda as Lilian "Lily" King
 Helen Gamboa as Elizabeth "Mamita" Martinez

Recurring guest cast 
 Johnny Revilla as Marlon "Hunyango" Cardenas
 Ping Medina as Nicolas "Nico" Valencia
 Regine Angeles as Olivia Mondigo
 Beauty Gonzalez as Dolores Ocampo
 Alex Anselmuccio as Lt. James Espiritu
 Neil Ryan Sese as Atty. Sandoval
 Kian Kazemi as Lt. Paul Isidro
 John Medina as 2nd Lt. Franco Walton
 Simon Ibarra as Manuel
 Gerard Pizzaras as Major Gonzales
 Cacai Bautista as Ula
 Mike Lloren as General Bernardo Rosario
 Ram Sagad as 1st Lt. Florentino (JR's immediate superior)
 Efren Reyes, Jr. as Ka Duroy

Cameo appearances 
 Celine Lim as young Audrey
 Francis Magundayao as young JR
 Carlo Lacana as young Dave
 Paul Salas as young Ramon
 Sharlene San Pedro as young Ingrid
 Cheska Billiones as young Marlene
 Desiree del Valle as young Rita
 Dimples Romana as young Elizabeth
 Rodjun Cruz as Stanley "Junior" King, Jr.
 Irma Adlawan as Berta Romano (Greta's mother)
 Cacai Bautista as Ula
 Gilberto Teodoro (former Philippine Defense Secretary) as himself
 Michael Conan as Pedring (Ka Duroy's second rebel commander)
 John James Uy as Edward de Castro
 Shamaine Centenera-Buencamino as Dionisio family attorney
 Jennifer Illustre as Ditas
 Paw Diaz as Michaela
 Robert Arevalo as Greg Martinez
 John Manalo as Benong / Jomar
 Tanya Gomez as Janice
 Marc Acueza as Charles
 Gian Sotto as Paul (Hunyango's assistant and Ramon's ally)
 Dionne Monsanto as TV News Reporter
 Charles Christianson as Peter
 Bing Davao as Alias Black Hawk
 Dido de la Paz as Jail Supt. Fernandez
 Mike Magat as Jail Officer II Vivar
 Michael Roy Jornales as Bong
 Mon Confiado as Brando
 Richard Poon as himself (singer for wedding of JR & Audrey)
 Menggie Cobarrubias as Lola Gets's doctor
 Leo Rialp as Audrey's doctor
 Cheryl Ramos as Audrey's ob-gynecologist
 Archie Adamos as Brigadier General Villanueva
 Rosanna Roces as Emma Garcia (finale episode)
 Enchong Dee as David Anthony Garcia III (finale episode)
 Krista Valle as Bar girl (Greta’s Friend of GRO)
 Auriette Divina as Audrey's classmate (uncredited)
 Melmar Magno as Ricky, Audrey's classmate (uncredited)

Reception

Citation from the Armed Forces
The production team of Tayong Dalawa and its three leading actors were cited by the Armed Forces of the Philippines for promoting a positive image of the Philippine military. The show is also credited for boosting the Philippine Military Academy's recruitment of prospective cadets by 300%, with the show also advertising the academy's entrance examinations at the end of each episode. Many episodes were shot inside the PMA campus in Baguio, where Anderson and Cuenca underwent training alongside the actual cadets. Anderson lamented that his and Cuenca's lack of Citizen Army Training experience was an initial problem in adjusting to the Academy's training regime.

Soundtrack
The show's title theme music is "Tayong Dalawa" by Gary Valenciano, and certain scenes use "Bukas Na Lang Kita Mamahalin" ("I Will Love You Tomorrow") by Lani Misalucha. The song "Tayong Dalawa" was originally composed and performed by Rey Valera and also covered by Sharon Cuneta for the theme song of her film with same title, with former husband Gabby Concepcion. Released in 1992, it was their final movie, after their annulment.

DVD release
On August 27, 2009 an announcement was made that Tayong Dalawa will be available on DVD. All volumes have been released. There are 20 volumes on DVD for the whole series.

Tayong Dalawa: The Untold Beginning (special episode)
On September 20, 2009, ABS-CBN aired Tayong Dalawa: The Untold Beginning. The made-for-TV movie features deleted scenes from the first few episodes of the series, which explores the origins of the rivalry between mother-daughter pairs Lola Gets-Marlene and Elizabeth-Ingrid. It also expounds on Ingrid and Marlene's separate love stories with David Garcia Sr.

Awards

International release

Remake and adaptations
A malaysian productions and Astro Prima remake version this drama named Angkara Cinta starring by Hun Haqeem, Meerqeen and Wanna Ali between 2020-2021

See also
List of programs aired by ABS-CBN
List of ABS-CBN drama series

References

External links
 

ABS-CBN drama series
Philippine action television series
Philippine melodrama television series
Philippine military television series
Philippine romance television series
2009 Philippine television series debuts
2009 Philippine television series endings
Television series by Dreamscape Entertainment Television
Filipino-language television shows
Television shows set in Manila
Television shows set in Baguio